Campbell Falls State Park Reserve is an undeveloped, public recreation area and nature preserve located in the town of Norfolk, Connecticut. Legislation passed in 1923 and 1924 provided for the joint management of the park after the land was donated to the two states by the White Memorial Foundation. A stone monument within the park marks the border between the states.

References

External links
Campbell Falls State Park Reserve Connecticut Department of Energy and Environmental Protection
Campbell Falls State Park Map Connecticut Department of Energy and Environmental Protection

State parks of Connecticut
Parks in Litchfield County, Connecticut
Norfolk, Connecticut
Protected areas established in 1923
Land Gifts of the White Memorial Foundation
1923 establishments in Connecticut